Bokang Mosena (born 6 February 1991) is a South African first-class cricketer. He was included in the Free State cricket team squad for the 2015 Africa T20 Cup.

References

External links
 

1991 births
Living people
South African cricketers
Free State cricketers
Place of birth missing (living people)